The 2015 Diamond League was the sixth season of the annual series of outdoor track and field meetings, organised by the International Association of Athletics Federations (IAAF). It consisted of fourteen one-day meetings, starting on 15 May in Doha, Qatar, and ending on 11 September in Brussels, Belgium. Other events were held in Shanghai, Eugene, Rome, Birmingham, Oslo, New York City, Paris, Lausanne, Fontvieille, Monaco, London, Stockholm, and Zürich. All previous venues remained on the tour, with the exception that London returned to host the second meeting in the United Kingdom, having been replaced by Glasgow during the 2014 IAAF Diamond League.

Schedule
The following fourteen meetings were included in the 2015 season:

Events
There are 16 men's and 16 women's disciplines in the Diamond League and seven events per discipline in the season. The total prize money for each competition is US$30,000, with a winner's share of $10,000. The season winner of each discipline wins US$40,000.

Results
Events not included in the Diamond League are marked in grey background.

Men

Track

Field

Women

Track

Field

Meeting highlights

Doha
Three Diamond League records were set in Doha during the opening competition of the series. Allyson Felix of the United States won the women's 200 metres with a run of 21.98 seconds to equal Veronica Campbell-Brown's time which was set during the inaugural 2010 IAAF Diamond League season. Jasmin Stowers, making her debut on the circuit, broke the women's 100 metres hurdles record with a time of 12.35 seconds – this raised her to seventh on the all-time rankings for the discipline. This placed him third on the all-time lists for the sport behind Jonathan Edwards and Kenny Harrison. Among the other results, Justin Gatlin of the United States became the fifth fastest man in the history of the 100 metres with his winning time of 9.74 seconds (bettering the world record of 9.77 seconds he set in 2006, which was annulled due to a failed doping test).

Shanghai
Almaz Ayana of Ethiopia gave the stand-out performance at the Shanghai Diamond League by running the third fastest women's 5000 metres of all-time, finishing in 14:14.32 minutes for a Diamond League record. In addition to these two performances, there were four other world-leading marks set during the competition: Silas Kiplagat (men's 1500 m), Jairus Kipchoge Birech (men's steeplechase), Gong Lijiao (women's shot put) and Nikoleta Kyriakopoulou (women's pole vault).

Eugene
Wind and temperature conditions suited the sprinting events. Justin Gatlin won the men's 200 metres in a world lead 19.68 seconds, while Shelly-Ann Fraser-Pryce won the women's 100 metres in another world lead of 10.81 seconds, sharing that time with Murielle Ahouré. Six women ran under 10.9 seconds that day, and China's Su Bingtian became the first man of Asian descent to break the 10-second barrier in the 100 m. Genzebe Dibaba attempted to top Almaz Ayana's 5000 metres run from Shanghai: although she came up short, her winning time of 14:19.76 was the fifth fastest ever run for the distance. A total of thirteen world-leading marks and six meet records were set at the two-day competition.

Rome
A total of five world leading marks were set at the Golden Gala. Ethiopian male distance runners provided two of these, with Mohamed Aman winning the 800 m in 1:43.56 minutes and 17-year-old Yomif Kejelcha taking his first Diamond race victory in the 5000 m with the first sub-13-minute run of the season. Hyvin Kiyeng Jepkemoi, also in her first Diamond race win, took the women's steeplechase in 9:15.08 minutes (a personal best by more than six seconds). The more experienced Ruth Beitia topped the women's high jump with a clearance of  – the 36-year-old Spaniard became the oldest woman to jump over that height. American Jennifer Simpson became the first woman under four minutes for the 1500 m that year.

Two meeting records were bettered in Rome. Justin Gatlin knocked one hundredth off Usain Bolt's 2012 time with 9.75 seconds in the men's 100 m. Pedro Pablo Pichardo took down two much longer-standing marks in the men's triple jump with his jump of : Jonathan Edwards 1998 meet record and also Khristo Markov's 1987 stadium record, which was the winning mark of the 1987 World Championships in Athletics. A strong women's 100 m hurdles field was notable for high-profile failures: Olympic champion Sally Pearson fell heavily and was injured, world champion Brianna Rollins clashed a hurdle and fell, and world leader Jasmin Stowers also hit a hurdle heavily and walked to the finish.

Birmingham
This mark was the best recorded in the discipline since 2006. There was some discussion over the validity of the throw: officials initially judged the throw to be outside the allowable sector, despite the throw going beyond the area that officials had marked out, and only was the meeting had finished did they accept Yego's effort. Another world lead and African record came in the non-standard 300 m sprint as Wayde van Niekerk won in 31.63 seconds.

Perković win made her the only athlete of the meeting to have won all Diamond races in a discipline after just five meetings, as Marvin Bracy's 100 m win erased Justin Gatlin's streak. Home athlete Adam Gemili broke the 10-second barrier for the first time in that race, becoming the sixth Briton to achieve the feat.

Oslo
In poor weather conditions, there were few record performances in Oslo. Genzebe Dibaba fell short in her 5000 m world record attempt, although her winning time of 14:21.29 minutes was still the seventh fastest ever recorded at that point. The sole world-leading performance of the evening was Kaliese Spencer's 400 m hurdles win in 54.15 seconds. This brought the Jamaican to twelve points in the Diamond race. Caterine Ibargüen also reached twelve points, extending her three-year unbeaten run. No men were left unbeaten in their Diamond race due to two unexpected victories. Robert Urbanek ousted his fellow Pole Piotr Małachowski to prevent him from taking three straight wins in the men's discus. In the absence of Diamond race leader Kirani James, Steven Gardiner broke the men's 400 m streak and took his first Diamond League win.

The greatest upset of the night came through Laura Muir in the women's 1500 m. The Briton built up a 40-metre lead to have her first major circuit win ahead of the more favoured Abeba Aregawi. The only other national record of the meet was a Belgian one of 3:51.84 minutes in the 1500 m by Pieter-Jan Hannes. Asbel Kiprop had his fourth career win at the Bislett Dream Mile, which was in its 50th anniversary.

New York
As in Oslo, poor weather meant only one world-leading mark was recorded in New York: Francena McCorory improved the women's 400 m time to 49.86 seconds – also a meeting record. Ajee' Wilson brought an end to Eunice Jepkoech Sum's run in the women's 800 m and Sandra Perković became the first athlete of the series to gather four straight wins.

In a non-Diamond race, Usain Bolt extended his unbeaten record in the 200 m, although his winning margin was narrow and his time over a second off his best. Wayde van Niekerk took the men's 400 m in a South African record time. Nikoleta Kyriakopoulou of Greece also set a national record, but her pole vault clearance of  left her second to Fabiana Murer on count-back.

Paris
Six world leading marks were established in Paris. Shelly-Ann Fraser-Pryce's 100 m in 10.74 was also a meeting record, as was Jairus Kipchoge Birech's steeplechase victory in 7:58.83. Eunice Sum (800 m), Orlando Ortega (110 m hurdles) and Silas Kiplagat (1500 m) were the others to set world leads.

Genzebe Dibaba and Almaz Ayana were both short again in a women's 5000 m world record attempt, although Genzebe's winning time of 14:15.21 was a new meet record. Three continental records were set at the meet: Wayde van Niekerk of South Africa ran an African record of 43.96 for the men's 400 m, France's Jimmy Vicaut was runner-up to Asafa Powell in the men's 100 m but equalled the European record at 9.86, while Evan Jager of the United States set a men's steeplechase record for the NACAC region. Jager did so despite a fall to the track at the last hurdle – a mistake that cost him the win over Birech and a certain sub-8 performance. A number of national records in athletics were also broken that day: Sergey Shubenkov improved the Russian record in the 110 m hurdles, Konstadinos Filippidis broke his nation's men's pole vault (a double for Greece in the event), Konstadinos Douvalidis equalled his Greek record in the 110 m hurdles, Selina Büchel improved the women's 800 m Swiss record to 1:57.95, and in the women's 400 m hurdles Sara Petersen and Kemi Adekoya broke their respective Danish and Bahraini records.

Two long-standing streaks were brought to an end at the competition. Valerie Adams, returning from surgery, lost to Christina Schwanitz in the women's shot put after having had 56 consecutive wins. Renaud Lavillenie was the favourite for the men's pole vault, but finished in fifth place and recorded his first loss in seven years at the meeting on home soil. Zuzana Hejnová won the 400 m hurdles to prevent  Kaliese Spencer (who was absent) from taking a fourth straight win. One streak that did continue was that of Colombia's Caterine Ibargüen, who joined Sandra Perković as the only unbeaten athletes on the Diamond League that year.

Lausanne
The Athletissima meeting saw one world leading performance:  by Anna Chicherova in the women's high jump. Four meet records were improved. Christian Taylor defeated Pedro Pablo Pichardo with a triple jump of  – the joint fourth best jump ever at that point.

Yaime Pérez had her first ever Diamond League win and in doing so brought an end to Sandra Perković's unbeaten streak in the women's discus throw. Zharnel Hughes (men's 200 m) and Shaunae Miller (women's 400 m) also had their first ever wins on the Diamond League circuit.

Monaco
At the Herculis meet Genzebe Dibaba provided the highlight with her 1500 metres world record of 3:50.07 minutes, breaking Qu Yunxia's time from the 1993 Chinese Games. The veracity of the previous record had been subject to doubt and Genzebe's time—almost two and a half seconds faster than any time set outside the Chinese Games—attracted questions in addition to plaudits. In response, she said "I want to live my own history. I`m not interested in others or the conditions". Nearly six seconds behind her, Sifan Hassan set a Dutch record and Shannon Rowbury ran a North American record.

One other Diamond League record was improved that evening, by Joe Kovacs in the men's shot put whose throw of  moved him to eighth on the all-time lists and was the best throw recorded in over a decade. Though not a Diamond race, the men's 1500 m saw Asbel Kiprop move up to third on the all-time lists with a run of 3:26.69 minutes. A total of six meeting records were broken – Habiba Ghribi's 9:11.28 in the women's steeplechase, Christian Taylor's  men's triple jump, and Justin Gatlin's 9.78 in the men's 100 m, were the other three marks addition to the above-mentioned performances. A total of eight world-leading performances were recorded.

Amel Tuka (men's 800 m) and Candyce McGrone (women's 200 m) both won their first Diamond League races in personal bests, with Tuka improving over a second and a half in three races in July, breaking his own Bosnia and Herzegovina record and becoming the 11th fastest performer of all time. Following defeat at the previous leg, Sandra Perković returned for a fifth win in the women's discus.

References
Results
Lists & Results 2015. Diamond League. Retrieved on 2015-06-13.
Specific

External links
Official website

Diamond League
Diamond League